Jason Fulford (born 1973) is an American photographer, publisher and educator, based in Brooklyn, New York City.

The primary format for Fulford's own photography is the book, which include Sunbird (2000), Crushed (2003), Raising Frogs For $$$ (2006), The Mushroom Collector (2010), Hotel Oracle (2013), Contains: 3 Books (2016), The Medium is a Mess (2018), and Clayton's Ascent (2018). He has had a solo exhibition at Minneapolis Institute of Art and is the recipient of a Guggenheim Fellowship.

Fulford is co-founder of J&L Books, where he is publisher, editor and book designer. He works as a photographer and has lectured at various universities.

Life and work
In 2000, Fulford and Leanne Shapton founded the non-profit publisher J&L Books.

He is based in Brooklyn, New York City, and married to Tamara Shopsin.

Fulford's photographs have been featured in The Atlantic, Harper's, The New Yorker, The New York Times, The New York Times Magazine, and Topic.

Publications

Publications of photographs by Fulford
Sunbird. Atlanta, GA: Bird Entertainment, 2000. With text by Adam Gilders. .
Crushed. Atlanta, GA: J&L, 2003. .
Raising Frogs For $$$. Los Angeles, CA: The Ice Plant, 2006. .
The Mushroom Collector. Amsterdam: Soon, 2010. Edited by Lorenzo De Rita. .
Notes on Fulford's Raising Frogs For $$$. Los Angeles, CA: The Ice Plant, 2011. .
Hotel Oracle. Edited by Lorenzo De Rita.
First edition. Amsterdam: The Soon Institute, 2013.  . Edition of 1000 copies.
Second edition. Amsterdam: The Soon Institute, 2014. . Edition of 1000 copies.
Contains: 3 Books. Amsterdam: The Soon Institute, 2016. Three volumes in a box, Mild Moderate Severe Profound, I Am Napoleon and &&. Edited by Lorenzo De Rita. .
The Medium is a Mess. Reggio Emilia: Studio Blanco, 2018. Edition of 500 copies.
Clayton's Ascent. TBW Subscription Series 6, Book 2. Oakland, CA: TBW, 2018. . Fulford, Guido Guidi, Gregory Halpern, and Viviane Sassen each had one book in a set of four. Edition of 1000 copies.
Picture Summer On Kodak Film. London: Mack, 2020. .

Publications about art for young readers

This Equals That. New York: Aperture, 2014. With Tamara Shopsin. .
Find Colors. London: Phaidon, 2018. With Shopsin, in partnership with the Whitney Museum of American Art. .
These Colors Are Bananas. London: Phaidon, 2018. With Shopsin, in partnership with the Whitney Museum of American Art. .
A Pile of Leaves. London: Phaidon, 2018. With Shopsin, in partnership with the Whitney Museum of American Art. .
Art This Way. London: Phaidon, 2018. With Shopsin, in partnership with the Whitney Museum of American Art. .

Publications edited by Fulford

The Photographer's Playbook: 307 Assignments and Ideas. New York: Aperture, 2014. . Edited by Fulford and Gregory Halpern.
Good 70s. Atlanta/New York: J&L/D.A.P., 2015. . By Mike Mandel with text by Sandra Phillips. Edited by Fulford and Sharon Gallagher.
Where To Score. Atlanta/San Francisco: J&L/Kadist, 2018. . Edited by Fulford and Jordan Stein.
Der Greif. Issue #11. Munich: Der Greif, 2018. ISSN 2191-4524. Edited by Fulford.
Photo No-No's: Meditations on What Not to Photograph, New York: Aperture, 2021. .

Publications with contributions by Fulford
Making Scenes. New York: Broadvision, 2001. By Penelope Trunk (as Adrienne Eisen). . Photographs and design by Fulford.
Eat Me: The Food and Philosophy of Kenny Shopsin. New York: Alfred A. Knopf, 2008. By Kenny Shopsin and Carolynn Carreño. . Photographs by Fulford and Tamara Shopsin. Foreword by Calvin Trillin.
Brooks Headley's Fancy Desserts. New York: W. W. Norton, 2014. By Brooks Headley. . Photographs and design by Fulford and Tamara Shopsin.
Paper Airplanes: The Collections of Harry Smith, Catalogue Raisonné, Volume I. Atlanta/New York: J&L/Anthology Film Archives, 2015. . Edited by John Klacsmann and Andrew Lampert. Photographs by Fulford.
String Figures: The Collections of Harry Smith, Catalogue Raisonné, Volume I. Atlanta/New York: J&L/Anthology Film Archives, 2015. . Edited by John Klacsmann and Andrew Lampert. Photographs by Fulford.
Bruce Conner Brass Handles. Atlanta, GA: J&L, 2016. . By Will Brown with text by Jean Conner. Photographs by Fulford.
All About Eggs. New York: Clarkson Potter, 2017. By Rachel Khong and the editors of Lucky Peach. . Photographs and design by Fulford and Tamara Shopsin.

Exhibitions

Solo exhibitions
New Pictures 5: Jason Fulford, The Mushroom Collection, Minneapolis Institute of Art, Minneapolis, October 2011 – April 2012. Photographs, publications, sculptures (involving the museum's permanent collection), and performances.
Mushroom Machine, San Francisco, CA, Kadist, May 2012.
Harry Smith's Paper Airplanes, SFO Museum, San Francisco, CA, May–August 2016.
High Anxiety, Fraenkel Gallery, San Francisco, CA, February–March 2017.
Fake Newsroom, Minnesota Street Project, San Francisco, CA, April 2017. With Jim Goldberg and Dru Donovan.

Group exhibitions or during festivals
Where There's Smoke, San Francisco, Fraenkel Gallery, July–August 2014. With Ruth Van Beek, Michael Lundgren and Viviane Sassen, Curated by Darius Himes.
Hotel Oracle, Krakow Photomonth, Krakow, Poland, 2014.
Begin Anywhere: Paths of Mentorship and Collaboration, SF Camerawork, San Francisco, CA, September–October 2017. Collaboration between Amanda Boe, McNair Evans, Kevin Kunishi, Fulford, Todd Hido, Mark Mahaney, Mike Smith, and Alec Soth.
The Mushroom Collection, Photo España, Madrid, 2018, Curated by Cristina De Middel.

Awards
2014: Guggenheim Fellowship from the John Simon Guggenheim Memorial Foundation

See also
Shopsin's – a diner in New York City whose chef/owner, Kenny Shopsin, is Tamara Shopsin's father

References

External links

1973 births
Living people
People from Atlanta
American photographers
American publishers (people)